ESO 439-26 is the least luminous white dwarf star known. Located 140 light years away from the Sun, it is roughly 10 billion years old and has a temperature of 4560 Kelvin. Thus, despite being classified as a "white dwarf", it would actually appear yellowish in color.

References 

White dwarfs
Hydra (constellation)